The Journal of Agricultural and Food Chemistry is a weekly peer-reviewed scientific journal established in 1953 by the American Chemical Society. Since 2015, Thomas Hofmann (Technical University of Munich) has been the editor-in-chief.

The journal covers research dealing with the chemistry and biochemistry of agriculture and food including work with chemistry and/or biochemistry as a major component combined with biological/sensory/nutritional/toxicological evaluation related to agriculture and/or food.

Abstracting and indexing
The journal is abstracted and indexed in Chemical Abstracts Service, Scopus, ProQuest, PubMed, CABI, and the Science Citation Index Expanded. According to the Journal Citation Reports, the Journal of Agricultural and Food Chemistry has a 2015 impact factor of 4.192.

See also

References

External links

American Chemical Society academic journals
Weekly journals
Biochemistry journals
English-language journals
Publications established in 1953
Food chemistry
Agricultural journals